Rebecca Television was launched in April 2010, and claims to be Britain's first investigative website. It combines television programs with journalism. It is independent and does not accept advertising or sponsorship. The editor is Paddy French, who was a television producer with ITV for ten years before starting the website.

Its first major story covered a Masonic directory naming over 10,000 Freemasons in Wales as part of a campaign to publish the names of all Freemasons in England and Wales. The story also examined the role of Freemasonry in a series of child abuse investigations.

Rebecca Magazine
French originally started Rebecca as "a radical magazine for Wales" in the 1970s. The title takes its name from the Rebecca Riots that took place in South and Mid Wales in the 19th century.

The magazine's reputation was based on a sustained critique of the Labour party in Wales. A series of reports eventually led to the creation of its "Corruption Supplement" in 1975. Fourteen local politicians and businessmen named in its pages went to prison following an investigation by two police forces. They included two leaders of Swansea City Council.

Rebecca articles have been picked up by national newspapers, including The Sunday Times. The magazine was also involved in the making of anti-corruption documentaries by the BBC's "Man Alive" and Thames Television's "This Week" programs.

In its eight years of printing, there were eleven issues that circumvented its success. Circulation issues, hampered by the refusal of mainstream distributors to handle the title, climbed to 10,000.

Rebecca closed in 1982 after an attempt to produce a monthly title with a full-time staff failed and relaunched as a website in 2010.

References

 
 
 Rebecca Television

External links
 Rebecca Reborn: Magazine that Shuttered in 1982 Re-Emerges as Subscription Site

British news websites